Prem Kumar, known mononymously as Prem, is an Indian actor who works in Kannada films.  He made his acting debut in 2004 through the film Praana. He won the Filmfare Award for Best Actor for Nenapirali in the year 2005 and for Charminar in 2013. He is popularly known as Lovely Star in Kannada films.

Career
Prem debuted in film with the 2004 Kannada film Praana. It was by a team of newcomers: director Prakash, composer Allwyn and the actress Preeti were all new besides Prem. The next year, Prem acted in Rathnaja's debut film, Nenapirali. 

Prem picked up a Best Actor Filmfare Award for his performance in the film. In 2006, Prem released Jothe Jotheyali with the actress Ramya. 

His next release Pallakki did well for 100 days. 

In 2008, Prem teamed up with Rathnaja once more for the film Honganasu. 

Prem acted in Ghauttham, a remake of the Tamil film Aahaa..! in 2009.
In 2010, he teamed up with heroine Ramya for the film Jothegara. Other films which he signed are Sihi Muttu, alongside Dhyan and Pooja Chopra, Januma Janumadallu with Andrita Ray, a cameo in Shivarajkumar's travel extravaganza Cheluveye Ninne Nodalu and also in Eradane Maduve.

Prem began his 2011 career with a cameo appearance in the multi-starrer film Eradane Maduve, which had Ananth Nag and Suhasini in the main lead. Later he starred in I Am Sorry Mathe Banni Preethsona, a film which made news for its controversial kiss scene between the lead pair. The other film of the year was Dhan Dhana Dhan opposite Sharmila Mandre, which also failed to get the box office collections.

In 2013, he acted in director Roopa Iyer's Chandra. While the Kannada version got a good opening, the Tamil version failed to open even at the box office. This was followed by R. Chandru's Charminar which found success and his performance was talked about with IBNLive.com praising him that "this" could well be considered his best film. He got his second Filmfare Best Actor award for this film. His next release was the two-year-old long pending project Shatru, which featured him in the role of a police officer for the first time. Though he got favorable reviews for his performance, the film failed at the box office.

His other long pending projects like Shatru and Athi Aparoopa released to a cold response at the box office in 2014. However, his other 2014 release Fair & Lovely with director Raghuram performed extremely well at the box office and earned him many accolades and awards. In 2015, Prem re-associated with R. Chandru through the film Male opposite Amulya. The film met with average response both critically and commercially. His next release was a cameo appearance in the all-women crew film Ring Road followed by a lead role in a romantic film Mast Mohabbat in 2016. In 2017, Prem starred as one of the jail inmates in the Dwarakish's 50th production multistarrer film Chowka, which went on to become one of the highest-grossing films of the year.

In 2014, he reported that he would appear in Prashant Raj's Dalapathi. Also in the making is director Dinakar Thoogudeepa's Life Jothe Ondu Selfie co-starring Prajwal Devaraj and Hariprriya.

Filmography

References

External links
 
 http://entertainment.oneindia.in/kannada/news/2011/lovely-star-premkumar-action-hero-shatru-220711-aid0062.html
 http://entertainment.oneindia.in/kannada/news/2010/prem-launches-website-190110.html

Male actors in Kannada cinema
Living people
Filmfare Awards South winners
Indian male film actors
Kannada people
21st-century Indian male actors
Male actors from Mysore
1976 births